Mazzano Romano is a  (municipality) in the Metropolitan City of Rome in the Italian region of Latium, located about  north of Rome.

Mazzano Romano borders the following municipalities: Calcata, Campagnano di Roma, Castel Sant'Elia, Faleria, Magliano Romano, Nepi.

First mentioned in 945, it is one of the villages that formed from the great estate assembled by Pope Adrian I about 780, his Domusculta Capracorum. It includes the  Regional Park of Veii.

References

External links
Official website

Cities and towns in Lazio